The Jewish state refers to the modern-day state of Israel.

Jewish state may also refer to:
 Proposals for a Jewish state
 Homeland for the Jewish people

Names

 The Jewish State, or Der Judenstaat, a book by Theodor Herzl

 Jewish State (ship), or USCGC Northland (WPG-49), ship of the United States Coast Guard

Countries

 State of Israel (1948-) 

 Jewish Autonomous Oblast (1934-), of the Soviet Union

 Khazar Khaganate ( 8th to 10th centuries AD)

 Sassanid Jewish Commonwealth - vassal state in Palestine (610 to 615 AD) of the Sassanid Empire

Yehud Medinata - province of the Achaemenid Empire (539 BC - 332 BC)

Khaybar (- 629 AD)

 Himyarite Kingdom based in Yemen (500 AD - 525 AD)

 Palaestina Prima (390 AD - 636 AD)

 Syria Palaestina (135 AD - 390 AD)

 Judea (Roman province) (6 AD - 135 AD)

 Adiabene (15 AD - 116 AD)

Kingdom of Semien (c. 4th century AD - 1627)

 Herodian Kingdom (37 BC - 44 AD)

 Hasmonean Kingdom (140 BC - 37 BC)

 Second Jewish Commonwealth (530 BC - 70 AD)

 Kingdom of Judah (930 BCE - 582 BC)

Kingdom of Israel (Samaria) (930 BC - 722 BC)

Kingdom of Israel (united monarchy) (1020 BC - 930 BC)

 the states of the 12 Tribes, see Israelites (c.1200 BC - 1020 BC)

See also 
 State Jewish Theater (disambiguation)
Halachic state - a state based on halacha (Jewish religious law)